The title Duke of Abercorn is a title in the Peerage of Ireland. It was created in 1868 and bestowed upon James Hamilton, 2nd Marquess of Abercorn. Although the Dukedom is in the Peerage of Ireland, it refers to Abercorn, West Lothian, and the Duke also bears four titles in Peerage of Scotland and two in the Peerage of Great Britain, and is one of only three peers who have titles in those three peerages. The Duke of Abercorn also claims the French title of Duke of Châtellerault, created in 1548.

History
In acknowledgement of his loyalty, James VI of Scotland (James I of England), conferred on the Hon. Claud Hamilton, third son of James Hamilton, 2nd Earl of Arran, the title Lord Paisley. His son James Hamilton was created Lord Abercorn on 5 April 1603, then on 10 July 1606 he was made Earl of Abercorn and Lord of Paisley, Hamilton, Mountcastell and Kilpatrick.

His successor, the 2nd Earl of Abercorn, was additionally created Lord Hamilton, Baron of Strabane, in the Peerage of Ireland, on 8 May 1617. He resigned this dignity to his younger brother in 1633; the brother's heirs inherited the Earldom and other titles in 1680, in the person of Claud Hamilton, 4th Earl of Abercorn. He was attainted in Ireland in 1691, and the Barony of Strabane forfeited, but his brother Charles Hamilton, 5th Earl of Abercorn, obtained a reversal of the attainder and recovered in 1692.

The 6th earl was at his accession an Irish baronet, "of Dunalong in the County of Tyrone, and of Nenagh in the County of Tipperary" (1660). He was additionally created Baron Mountcastle and Viscount Strabane, in the Peerage of Ireland, on 2 September 1701. The 7th earl became the first of the Earls of Abercorn to be invested a Privy Counsellor, having been appointed to both the English and Irish Privy Councils. The 8th earl was created Viscount Hamilton, of Hamilton, in the Peerage of Great Britain on 24 August 1786. He was succeeded by his nephew, who was created Marquess of Abercorn in the Peerage of Great Britain on 15 October 1790, after having sat in the House of Commons as MP for East Looe and for St Germans. He was made a Knight of the Order of the Garter in 1805.

The 2nd Marquess, who had been given the Garter in 1844, served as Lord Lieutenant of Ireland from 1866 to 1868 (and again from 1874 to 1876); and on 10 August 1868, during his first term, he was created Marquess of Hamilton, of Strabane, and Duke of Abercorn (in the Peerage of Ireland). His successor, the 2nd Duke, continued the family tradition by being awarded the Garter in 1892; the 3rd Duke served as MP for Londonderry and as Governor of Northern Ireland, along with being created a Knight of St Patrick and given the Garter. Currently, the holder of the Dukedom is James Hamilton, 5th Duke of Abercorn, also a Knight of the Garter.

Of the subsidiary titles above, Marquess of Hamilton is the courtesy title of the heir apparent, and Viscount Strabane that of his heir-apparent.

The Dukes of Abercorn also claim the French title of Duc de Châtellerault, as heirs-male of the 2nd Earl of Arran, who was granted the title in 1548 by Henry II of France. Additionally, since the death of William Hamilton, 2nd Duke of Hamilton, in 1651, the Earls, Marquesses, and Dukes of Abercorn have been the rightful claimants to the peerage dignities of Earl of Arran (of the 1503 creation) and Lord Hamilton (of the 1445 creation), both in the Peerage of Scotland, as the most senior heirs-male of James Hamilton, Duke of Châtellerault, and this title is reflected in their coat of arms, with an inescutcheon of three fleurs-de-lys and a French ducal crown.

Diana, Princess of Wales was a great-granddaughter of the 3rd Duke of Abercorn.

The family seat is Baronscourt (usually known locally as Baronscourt Castle), a neo-Classical country house on the Barons Court Estate near Newtownstewart, Omagh, a village near Strabane, County Tyrone, Northern Ireland. The traditional burial place of the Dukes of Abercorn and their families is the cemetery at Baronscourt Parish Church.

List of titleholders

Lords Paisley (1587)
Claud Hamilton, 1st Lord Paisley (1543–1621) was a Scottish politician
The 1st Earl of Abercorn was the 1st Lord's eldest son. He predeceased his father
James Hamilton, 2nd Lord Paisley was already 2nd Earl of Abercorn

Earls of Abercorn (1606)
Other titles: Lord Abercorn, in the county of Linlithgow (Sc 1603) and Lord Paisley, Hamilton, Mountcashell and Kirkpatrick (Sc 1606)
James Hamilton, 1st Earl of Abercorn (1575–1618) had been created Lord Abercorn in 1603
Other titles (2nd Earl onwards): Lord Paisley, in the county of Renfrew (Sc 1587)
Other titles (2nd Earl): Baron Hamilton of Strabane, in the county of Tyrone (Ir 1617, res. 1633)
James Hamilton, 2nd Earl of Abercorn ( – c. 1670), eldest son of the 1st Earl, succeeded his grandfather as 2nd Lord Paisley in 1621
James Hamilton, Lord Paisley (c. 1633 – c. 1670), eldest son of the 2nd Earl, died without male issue
George Hamilton, 3rd Earl of Abercorn (c. 1636–c. 1680), third and youngest son of the 2nd Earl, died unmarried
Other titles (4th Earl): Baron Hamilton of Strabane, in the county of Tyrone (Ir 1617, suc. 1668, att. 1691)
Claud Hamilton, 4th Earl of Abercorn (c. 1659–c. 1691), already 5th Lord Hamilton, was descended from the 3rd son of the 1st Earl. He died unmarried
Other titles (5th Earl onwards): Baron Hamilton of Strabane, in the county of Tyrone (Ir 1617, rest. 1692)
Charles Hamilton, 5th Earl of Abercorn (died 1701), younger brother of the 4th Earl, died without issue
James Hamilton, 6th Earl of Abercorn (c. 1661–1734), eldest son of Col James, himself eldest son of Sir George, himself fourth and youngest son of the 1st Earl
Other titles (7th Earl onwards): Viscount Strabane and Baron Mountcastle, in the county of Tyrone (Ir 1701)
James Hamilton, 7th Earl of Abercorn (1685–1744), eldest son of the 6th Earl
Other tiles (8th Earl onwards): Viscount Hamilton (GB 1786)
James Hamilton, 8th Earl of Abercorn (1712–1789), eldest son of the 7th Earl, died unmarried
John Hamilton, 9th Earl of Abercorn (1756–1818) was created Marquess of Abercorn in 1790

Marquesses of Abercorn (1790)
Other titles: Earl of Abercorn (Sc 1606), Viscount Strabane (Ir 1701), Viscount Hamilton (GB 1786), Lord Paisley, in the county of Renfrew (Sc 1587), Lord Abercorn, in the county of Linlithgow (Sc 1603), Lord Paisley, Hamilton, Mountcashell and Kirkpatrick (Sc 1606), Lord Hamilton of Strabane, in the county of Tyrone (Ir 1617) and Baron Mountcastle, in the county of Tyrone (Ir 1701)
John Hamilton, 1st Marquess of Abercorn (1756–1818), only son of Capt John, himself second son of the 7th Earl
James Hamilton, Viscount Hamilton (1786–1814), elder son of the 1st Marquess, predeceased his father
James Hamilton, 2nd Marquess of Abercorn (1811–1885) was created Duke of Abercorn in 1868

Dukes of Abercorn (1868)
Other titles: Marquess of Abercorn (GB 1790), Marquess of Hamilton, of Strabane in the county of Tyrone (1868), Earl of Abercorn (Sc 1606), Viscount Strabane (Ir 1701), Viscount Hamilton (GB 1786), Lord Paisley, in the county of Renfrew (Sc 1587), Lord Abercorn, in the county of Linlithgow (Sc 1603), Lord Paisley, Hamilton, Mountcashell and Kirkpatrick (Sc 1606), Lord Hamilton of Strabane, in the county of Tyrone (Ir 1617) and Baron Mountcastle, in the county of Tyrone (Ir 1701)
James Hamilton, 1st Duke of Abercorn (1811–1885), elder son of Lord Hamilton
James Hamilton, 2nd Duke of Abercorn (1838–1913), eldest son of the 1st Duke
James Albert Edward Hamilton, 3rd Duke of Abercorn (1869–1953), eldest son of the 2nd Duke. His daughter Cynthia Spencer, Countess Spencer was grandmother of Diana, Princess of Wales.
James Edward Hamilton, 4th Duke of Abercorn (1904–1979), elder son of the 3rd Duke. 
James Hamilton, 5th Duke of Abercorn (born 1934), elder son of the 4th Duke

Line of succession

 James Hamilton, 1st Duke of Abercorn (1811-1885)
 James Hamilton, 2nd Duke of Abercorn (1838-1913)
 James Hamilton, 3rd Duke of Abercorn (1869-1953)
 James Hamilton, 4th Duke of Abercorn (1904-1979)
 James Hamilton, 5th Duke of Abercorn (b. 1934)
(1) James Hamilton, Marquess of Hamilton (b. 1969)
(2) James Hamilton, Viscount Strabane (b. 2005)
(3) Lord Claud Hamilton (b. 2007)
(4) Lord Nicholas Hamilton (b. 1979)
(5) Lord Claud Hamilton (b. 1939)
(6) Alexander Hamilton (b. 1987)

Family tree

See also
Duchess of Abercorn (disambiguation)
Duke of Hamilton
Earl of Arran (Scotland)
Hamilton baronets
Proby baronets of Elton Hall
Clan Douglas

References

External links
Baronscourt House official website

Dukedoms in the Peerage of Ireland
Noble titles created in 1868
County Tyrone
1868 establishments in Ireland
Lists of dukes in Ireland
British landowners
Dukes of Abercorn